Erfoud is an oasis town in the Sahara Desert, in the Drâa-Tafilalet region, eastern Morocco. It belongs to ait atta tribe, divided into several districts: Hay Salam, Hay Jdid, Hay Ziz, Hay el Bathaa, Hay Annahda, and Hay el Hamri.

Due to its proximity to Merzouga desert village in the Erg Chebbi Dunes, Erfoud has developed tourist-related infrastructures such as hotels and restaurants.

Filming location
Erfoud is a destination for filmmakers due to the beauty of the surrounding Sahara Desert and the town's oasis areas. Erfoud has been a filming location for many films, including: 
March or Die (1977)
In the film archeologists are uncovering an ancient city near Erfoud buried by a sand storm 3,000 years ago. The site is the resting place of a Berber saint, "The Angel of the Desert".

The Mummy (1999)
Filming began in Marrakech, Morocco on May 4, 1998 and lasted 17 weeks. Photography then moved to the Sahara Desert outside Erfoud.

Production designer Allan Cameron found a dormant volcano near Erfoud where the entire set for Hamunaptra could be constructed.

Prince of Persia (2010)
Mike Newell selected Morocco as a shooting location for the film and also planned to film in Pinewood Studios. Filming began in July 2008 in Morocco. Eight weeks were spent in Morocco before the first unit moved to Pinewood.

SPECTRE (2015)
For the 24th (official) James Bond film, the nearby Gara Medouar played the part of an enemy headquarters.

Mars analogue research
This area of Morocco has also been identified as being very similar in appearance and possibly geology to certain areas on the planet Mars. Because of this, there is an interest in this area as a field research location for Mars analogue research.

In February 2013 the Austrian Space Forum spent the whole month with a field team including two space suit simulators (Aouda.X and Aouda.S) and a number of rovers to conduct a large number of experiments. They were supported by a Mission Support Center run from Innsbruck, Austria to simulate a mission to the surface of Mars. The main desert base camp was named Camp Weyprecht on February 11, with a later satellite camp about 80 km further south being called Station Payer.

References 

Populated places in Errachidia Province
Oases of Morocco